Book of Love, also known as Book of Love: The Definitive Reason Why Men Are Dogs is a 2002 American romantic comedy film, written and directed by Jeffrey W. Byrd, and starring Anthony "Treach" Criss, Eric K. George, and Richard T. Jones as its three male protagonists.

Plot
Book of Love is a mockumentary following the unrelated stories of three L.A. bachelors (Eric K. George, Anthony "Treach" Criss, and Richard T. Jones) as they recover from a series of unhealthy relationships. The team of average Joes are no match for their manipulative girlfriends (Salli Richardson, Mari Morrow, and Robin Givens), however, and the over eager men are taken for all they're worth. It's this manipulative, self-serving treatment that drives the young bachelors into behaving like "dogs" themselves.

Production 
Written and directed by Jeffrey Byrd, Book of Love was produced by both BET Studios and 5th GearEntertainment, and eventually released by Strange Fruit Films. Three Black women co-produced the film.

Cast
 Eric K. George — Will Hart
 Anthony "Treach" Criss — Jay Black
 Richard T. Jones — Ben Strong
 Salli Richardson — Karen
 Mari Morrow — Lyah
 Robin Givens — Iyanna
 Denise Dowse — Karen's Mom
 Reggie Theus — Carl
 Adam Clark — Derrick
 Angelle Brooks — Renee
 Dennis W. Hall — Man on toilet

Cameos
Cameo appearances in the film include: Darryl "Chill" Mitchell, Eric A. Payne, Flex Alexander, Gillian Iliana Waters, Jagged Edge, John Salley, Khalil Kain, Loretta Devine, Pepa (Salt-N-Pepa), Robert Townsend, and Taraji P. Henson.

Premiere and reception 
Book of Love's world premiere closed the 1999 Black Hollywood Film Festival.

A Variety review was largely positive, noting "Book of Love has the rhythms of a sketch-comedy movie, and, although it drags in places, most of the sketches are on the mark. The most uproarious sketches are also the most familiar, but the filmmakers add an impressive amount of freshness to oft-seen situations".

Kaia N. Shivers' review in Los Angeles Sentinel reads, "Though it is an outlet for wounded hearts and real life love drama, the story is a light comedy with intelligent and mature humor".

References

External links 
 
 

2002 romantic comedy-drama films
2002 films
African-American romance films
African-American gender relations in popular culture
Artisan Entertainment films
Films shot in Los Angeles
American romantic comedy-drama films
Films scored by Stephen James Taylor
2002 directorial debut films
2002 comedy films
2002 drama films
Films directed by Jeffrey W. Byrd
2000s English-language films
2000s American films